Luchki is a rural locality (a selo) and the administrative center of Luchkovskoye Rural Settlement, Prokhorovsky District, Belgorod Oblast, Russia. The population was 371 as of 2010. There are 4 streets.

Geography 
Luchki is located 33 km southwest of Prokhorovka (the district's administrative centre) by road. Nechayevka is the nearest rural locality.

References 

Rural localities in Prokhorovsky District